The City of Greater Geraldton is a local government area in the Mid West region of Western Australia,  north of the state capital, Perth on the Indian Ocean.

It was established on 1 July 2011 following the amalgamation of the Shire of Mullewa and the City of Geraldton-Greenough, itself a product of a 2007 amalgamation between the City of Geraldton and Shire of Greenough.

History

A recommendation was made to the Minister for Local Government by the Local Government Advisory Board in August 2006 to amalgamate the Shire of Greenough with the City of Geraldton.

The Greenough electors successfully petitioned for a referendum to determine whether amalgamation should proceed. This was held on 2 December 2006, and with a participation rate of 28.74%, a majority of 80% voted against the proposal. However, under the Local Government Act 1995 (clause 10 of Schedule 2.1) as the vote did not attract 50% of registered voters, it did not meet the requirements for a valid poll.

The Liberal government, elected in mid-2008, announced its intentions to amalgamate local governments around the state in line with reforms undertaken elsewhere in Australia. Ultimately, the plan did not succeed, but a number of local governments commenced negotiations for voluntary mergers. One such group included the City, the Shire of Chapman Valley and the Shire of Mullewa. In February 2010, Chapman Valley decided not to proceed, citing community opposition. In December 2010, the Local Government Advisory Board approved the merger. Polls were held in both municipalities, with 72.61% of voters in Geraldton-Greenough and 83.23% of voters in Mullewa voting against the merger. However, both polls failed to reach the minimum 50% required to be a valid poll, and the City of Greater Geraldton came into being on 1 July 2011.

Until the October 2011 elections, the council was administered by five commissioners, led by Ron Yuryevich, the mayor of City of Kalgoorlie-Boulder, and including Ian Carpenter, the mayor of the former City and Nino Messina, the mayor of the former Shire.

Wards
The City is divided into seven wards, each with two councillors, plus a directly elected mayor to serve the entire district.

 Champion Bay Ward – contains Beresford, Spalding and Webberton
 Chapman Ward – contains Bluff Point, Drummond Cove, Glenfield, Sunset Beach and Waggrakine
 Port Ward – contains Geraldton itself, Beachlands and Mahomets Flats
 Tarcoola Ward – contains Mount Tarcoola, Tarcoola Beach and Wandina
 Willcock Ward – contains Karloo, Rangeway, Wonthella and part of Utakarra
 Hills Ward – contains the majority of the former City's land area, and includes the suburbs of Strathalbyn and Woorree
 Mullewa Ward – the entire former Shire of Mullewa.

Towns, suburbs and localities
The towns, suburbs and localities of the City of Greater Geraldton with population and size figures based on the most recent Australian census:

(* indicates locality is only partially located within the city)

Mayors

Population

The population of Greater Geraldton grew from 34,019 in 2001 to 38,634 at the 2016 census, representing an increase of 14%. Unemployment in Greater Geraldton at the census was estimated at 8.8%, compared to 7.8% in Western Australia and 6.9% nationally.

The historical populations of the area which formed Geraldton-Greenough were:

Heritage-listed places

As of 2023, 744 places are heritage-listed in the City of Greater Geraldton, of which 86 are on the State Register of Heritage Places.

References

External links
 

Greater Geraldton